Botswana competed at the 2002 Commonwealth Games. The African nation sent seventeen athletes in three sports. For the first time in their Commonwealth Games history, Botswana won multiple medals, capturing three, including two in boxing.

Medals

Silver
Athletics:
 Gable Garenamotse — Men's Long Jump

Boxing:
 Lechedzani Luza — Men's Flyweight (– 51 kg)

Bronze
Boxing:
 Gilbert Khunwane — Men's Lightweight (– 60 kg)

Results by event

Athletics
Lulu Basinyi 	
Glody Dube 	
Gable Garenamotse
Johnson Kubisa 	
Otukile Lekote 	
California Molefe 	
Oganeditse Moseki

Badminton
Joyce Malebogo Arone  	
Makhula Makhula 	
Mmoloki Motlhala 	
Oreeditse Thela 	
Leungo Tshweneetsile

Boxing
Men's Flyweight (– 51 kg)
Lechedzani Luza

Men's Bantamweight (– 54 kg)
Khumiso Ikgopoleng 	

Men's Featherweight (– 57 kg)
Leslie Sekotswe

Men's Lightweight (– 60 kg)
Gilbert Khunwane 	

Men's Light Welterweight (– 63.5 kg)
Dintwa Sloca

See also
Botswana at the 2000 Summer Olympics
Botswana at the 2004 Summer Olympics

References
 Official results by country

Botswana at the Commonwealth Games
Nations at the 2002 Commonwealth Games
2002 in Botswana sport